Valley Head is a census-designated place (CDP) in Randolph County, West Virginia, United States. Valley Head has a post office with ZIP code 26294. As of the 2010 census, its population was 267.

The community was named for the nearby headwaters of the Tygart Valley River.

Notable people
Country musician and Grand Ole Opry member Wilma Lee Cooper was born in Valley Head in 1921.
Banking executive Jean Yokum was born in Valley Head in 1931.

Climate
The climate in this area has mild differences between highs and lows, and there is adequate rainfall year-round.  According to the Köppen Climate Classification system, Valley Head has a marine west coast climate, abbreviated "Cfb" on climate maps.

References

External links
 Traveling 219: Valley Head

Census-designated places in Randolph County, West Virginia
Census-designated places in West Virginia